Vejle Boldklub is a Danish professional football club based in Vejle in Jutland. Formed in 1891, the club is one of the most successful clubs in Danish football history, having won the Danish championship five times and the Danish cup title six times.

VB is famous for being the only Danish club to develop a European Footballer of the Year winner in Allan Simonsen who won it in 1977. The club is also famous for developing several international players such as Thomas Gravesen, Tommy Troelsen, Ulrik le Fevre, and John Sivebæk. On the European stage, Vejle Boldklub has played in the UEFA Champions League in 1972–73, 1973–74, 1979–80, and 1985–86. VB has also participated in the UEFA Cup Winners Cup and the UEFA Cup three times each. VB's most memorable moments in Europe so far has been reaching the UEFA Cup Winners Cup Quarter-finals in 1977–78, facing HNK Hajduk Split in the UEFA Champions League Round of 16 in 1979–80, and beating Real Betis 1–0 in the first leg of the 1st round of the 1998–99 UEFA Cup tournament.

The club is based in the northern part of the city with the club's homeground being Vejle Stadium built in 2008. The stadium is located in Nørreskoven (the northern forest) which VB has called home since 1922. The club has played in red shirts and white shorts since 1911. The main rivals of Vejle Boldklub are AGF and AC Horsens.

On 28 June 2016, Vejle Boldklub got new ownership. Moldovan Andrew Zolotko took over the majority of shares in the club, while Klaus Eskildsen kept the remaining shares. Andrew Zolotko himself has been club chairman since 2017. In addition to the two owners – Zolotko and Eskildsen – the club's match record holder Gert Eg also sits on the board.

History
The club was founded by 23 men from Vejle on 3 May 1891 as a cricket club. Football first became a part of the club's activities in 1902.

The first golden age

The period from 1910 to 1920 is often referred to as Vejle Boldklub's first golden age. In this period the club took part in the Jutland championship final seven times and won it four times in 1912, 1913, 1914 and 1915.

The 1950s: A golden decade

About 15,000 people were seated at Vejle Stadium on 22 May 1952, when Vejle Boldklub secured promotion to the second best Danish league in a  match against Odense KFUM. One of the central players in the Vejle team was Bent Sørensen, who later went on to become the club's first national team player.

On 10 May 1956, VB in front of 25,000 people in Parken, Copenhagen, met B93 in a qualification game for a place in the best Danish league. Once again Bent Sørensen scored the winner. After this VB played in the best Danish league for 36 years, which is the record.

In 1958 the club won its first Danish championship, and also went on to win the Danish cup. This made VB the first club in Denmark to win the Double. Among the stars in the squad was Tommy Troelsen and Henning Enoksen. Tommy Troelsen was only 17 years old when he played in the final.

Normally 15,000–20,000 people attended the matches in Vejle those days. K.B. were beaten 8–3 and Odense Boldklub were sent home with a 7–2 defeat. The manager was Frits Gotfredsen and he was the man who started developing the attacking style of play that made VB the most popular club in Denmark in this period.

The 1959 season also offered great moments for the history books. The biggest triumph was without a doubt the cup win against AGF. 33,000 people came to the national arena to watch the match between the two great clubs from Jutland. VB won the game 1–0, but it has never been decided who scored the winner. Both the ball, Henning Enoksen and a couple of AGF players were in the net. However, it was a goal and VB could celebrate the club's second cup win in two years.

At the Olympic Games in Rome in 1960 four VB players were selected in the Danish side which sensationally won a silver medal. The four VB players were: Henning Enoksen, Tommy Troelsen, Poul Mejer and Poul Jensen (captain).

The 1970s: A triumphal march

In 1971 Vejle Boldklub celebrated its 80 years jubilee and the players gave the club the best birthday present possible: the Danish championship trophy and the club's first ticket to the European Champions Cup. The trophy was won through great attacking football, and there was never any doubt that VB would win it.

Danish football followers were impressed with the new top side in Danish football and thousands of people came to Vejle to enjoy the charming football of Vejle Boldklub. Among the many stars in the team were Allan Simonsen and Flemming Serritslev. The manager was once again Frits Gotfredsen. He ended his amazing career in Vejle Boldklub after this big triumph.

In the 1972 season VB went on to prove that the team was now on top of Danish football. The Danish championship in 1971 was followed up by another cup triumph and once again the Danish championship ended up in Vejle – The Double.

The title was won even more convincingly than the year before after ten straight victories in the spring half of the season. It was simply VB and the others. After the 1972 season VB's biggest star, Allan Simonsen, joined German giants Borussia Mönchengladbach, where he was named European Footballer of the Year in 1977 – so far the only Danish player in history.

In the 1975 season VB did not live up to the huge expectations in the league. However, the club delivered some great attacking football in the cup tournament and went on to win the final for the fourth time with a 1–0 victory over Holbæk. Club record holder, Gert Eg, scored with a great first timer, which qualified VB for the European Cup Winners Cup.

The 19 May 1977 Vejle Boldklub won its third cup final in only six years. The fifth cup triumph was won with a 2–1 victory against B1909. The goal scorers for Vejle was Ib Jacquet and Knud Nørregård. VB could now call itself the best cup team in Denmark – a status that was taken away from AGF.

Vejle reached the quarter-finals of the European Cup-Winners' Cup in the 1977–78 campaign.

In the following season, 1978, Vejle Boldklub underlined its top position in Danish football by winning the Danish title for the fourth time in the club's history. Manager Poul Erik Bech and his players could celebrate the victory in Vejle before the last game as AGF and Esbjerg fB could no longer catch the reds. Among the stars in the team were Alex Nielsen, Tommy Hansen and Ulrik le Fevre, who later became the first player to score Tor des Jahres in the German Bundesliga.

The 1980s: The trophies are brought to Vejle

In 1978 Vejle Boldklub became the first team to win the Danish title after the involvement of money in Danish football. But as it turned out VB would find it difficult to adapt to the new times.

However, at the start of the decade VB continued in the footsteps of the successful 1970s teams. On 28 May 1981 Boldklubben Frem was beaten 2–1 in the cup final. This meant that the beautiful trophy – which Danish clubs had been fighting for since 1955 – was brought to Vejle permanently and placed in the club house in Nørreskoven.

In 1983 Allan Simonsen – named third best player in Europe the same year – returned to Vejle Boldklub. Simonsen had a big impact on the team and was a major influence as the club went on to win its fifth Danish title in 1984. With this victory the greatest trophy in Danish football found a permanent spot in the club house in Vejle next to the cup winners trophy. Among the biggest stars in the squad were John Sivebæk, Allan Simonsen and Steen Thychosen, who became the league top scorer with 24 goals.

After some indifferent seasons VB was in 1988 taken over by four local businessmen. Once again the club started dreaming about titles and the fans were excited by the signings of star players such as Preben Elkjær, John Larsen and Keld Bordinggaard. However, the new manager Ebbe Skovdahl could not get the team to work together even though he had several star players in his side.

1991: A dark year

Vejle Boldklub's centenary was celebrated in the worst possible manner with relegation to the second tier for the first time since 1956. Many star players went to play for other clubs and a sad atmosphere of crisis descended upon Vejle. The four businessmen left the club, but ensured on their way out that it was not in dire straits. To turn things around VB hired their old star player Allan Simonsen as new manager. However, it was a thankless task for Simonsen, who started his managerial career with a defeat.

In 1994 the successful manager from 1981, Ole Fritsen, was named as the new manager of Vejle Boldklub. As a former youth coach in the club, Ole knew all about the many talented young players in VB, amongst which were Kaspar Dalgas and Peter Graulund. Ole started to build up a new team around these young players.

Vejle Boldklub was back in the top Danish league in 1995. Ole Fritsen's young team played impressive, charming and attacking football, which earned them runners-up medals in 1997 and qualification for the UEFA Cup on two occasions. For his fine work, Ole Fritsen was named Danish Manager of the Year in 1997.

2000s: Crises and rebuilding

At the beginning of the new millennium, VB was relegated from the Danish super league for the second time in the club's history. They were back after only one season in the first division, but it turned out to be a short respite as the club was relegated the same season. This proved to be the beginning of a serious crisis. In 2004, VB was almost relegated to the third tier division and the club was threatened with bankruptcy. This resulted in desperate attempts to save the club through amalgamations with clubs in the north, south, east and west.

But, in late 2004, another turning point was reached when a group of visionary businessmen reconstructed the club's finances and launched the so-called four point plan: A new stadium, promotion to the Danish super league, income through business other than football and a new sponsor strategy. In 2006, VB was back in the first division. However, the club made a dreadful start to the season with nine defeats in a row. But a successful second half of the season pointed it in the right direction and optimism returned.

Today, VB draws together the most successful businesses in south-east Jutland, which makes the club potentially one of the wealthiest in Danish football. And where the club earlier had to look in vain for local support, today it is seen as an attractive investment.

In spring 2008, Vejle Boldklub opened the gates to its new modern stadium. It retains the name of Vejle Stadium and is still located in Nørreskoven.

On 5 June 2008, VB achieved a record in scoring the highest number of points to win the Danish 1st Division. Promotion to the Superliga was secured with 78 points from 30 matches.

By the 32nd round of the 2008–09 season, it was clear VB would be relegated to play in the Danish 1st Division during the 2009–10 season.

2010–12: Merger with Kolding FC
On 8 December 2010, Vejle Boldklub announced that the club known as Vejle Blodklub would merge with Kolding FC and from July 2011 would be known as Vejle Boldklub Kolding. This would mark an end for Vejle Boldklub and the beginning of yet another Danish fusion club.

2012: Resurrection
In November 2012 Kolding IF withdrew from the agreement with Vejle Boldklub. This resulted in the dissolution of Vejle Boldklub Kolding, and Vejle Boldklub inherited the merger club's licence in the Danish 1st Division for the upcoming 2013–14 season.

2013–16: Fighting to return to the Danish Superliga
From the start of the season in the summer of 2013, Vejle Boldklub once again played under the name VB in the Danish tournament. After four seasons in the 1st division the club was still chasing a promotion to the Danish Superliga, but neither the seasons 2013–14 and 2014–15 were any great success. In the first season, VB built a new team under head coach Tonny Hermansen, but was only able to secure a middle position. A couple of players from outside the club came in the following season, but the results did not improve and VB changed coach in the autumn of 2014. Swedish Klebér Saarenpää got better results and what for a long time looked like a bad position in the lower half, was saved with a good spring. Especially the Faroese Jóan Símun Edmundsson became a great player for VB and he secured the club many points in the spring.

In the 2015–16 season, it was again the ambition was yet again to fight for promotion. Despite the strengthening of the team with several new players up to the season, the Vejlensers chased  after AC Horsens, Silkeborg and Lyngby who eventually secured promotion for most of the season. Profile Jóan Símun Edmundsson only played in the autumn before he was sold to Odense Boldklub. In the spring, the VB head coach changed six games before the end of the season. Sports director Steen Thychosen took over the responsibility in a last attempt to catch up with the top teams, but it turned out not to be enough. VB defeated AC Horsens in all three matches of the season – especially the match at Vejle Stadium in March is one of the most memorable matches in Nørreskoven in the decade. After 0–0 at the break, VB won 4–3 on Anders Kaagh's match winning goal in the match's overtime.

2016–present: Zolotko era
On 28 June 2016, Vejle Boldklub got a new owner. Moldovan Andrew Zolotko took over the majority of shares in the club, while Klaus Eskildsen kept the remaining shares. In the summer of 2016, Swedish Andreas Alm took over as head coach of Vejle Boldklub. The former AIK Stockholm coach took over a brand new VB squad, where there were only six players returning from the 2015–16 season. A large number of players from Europe, South America and Africa came in and in record time – three weeks from the first training session to the season premiere – a new VB team had to get ready. The results over the autumn were mixed for the new and young VB team, but there was plenty of talent in the team. In particular, the Brazilian Dominic Vinicius, the goalkeeper Pavol Bajza, the Ivorian D'Avila Ba Loua, Jacob Schoop and the young talents Agon Mucolli and Christian Kudsk shone, but as the season progressed, the Vejlens did not escape the relegation zone. Survival was secured in the 31st round, and then the work could start on shaping the team that was to chase the promotion in the following season.

Italian Adolfo Sormani took over as head coach in Nørreskoven in the summer of 2017 and with the experienced Italian also came a sporting upgrade. Jacob Krüger was hired in the position of technical director and he put a strong squad together around the Italian coaching staff. Defensive profiles like Mads Greve and Rasmus Lauritsen came from competing 1st division clubs, midfielder Ylber Ramadani came from Albanian football. Tunisian Imed Louati and Brazilian Allan Sousa, who had joined VB in February 2017, had gradually become accustomed to Danish football and the two offensive players, together with Dominic Vinicius, played a major role in the coming season. VB started strongly in the new season and took a top position all fall.

During the winter break, the first player sales came under the new owners, when Vejle Boldklub made a transfer of four players. They were Oliver Drost (AC Horsens), Victor Wernersson (IFK Gothenburg), Wang Xin (Guangzhou R&F) and Dominic Vinicius (Beijing BSU). Despite the four departures and a difficult start to the spring of 2018, Vejle Boldklub secured the direct promotion to the Super League ahead of competing clubs such as Esbjerg fb, Viborg FF and Vendsyssel FF. It all culminated in the 33rd round on the road against Thisted FC, where VB won 2–0.

After a nine-year absence, Vejle Boldklub made a comeback to the Superliga in the 2018–19 season. After a great start to the season with five points in the first three games, the team came down to earth during the autumn season. Before the season, the Swedes Gustaf Nilsson and Melker Hallberg, the Irishman Sean Murray, young Adam Jakobsen, while Vladlen Yurchenko and Nathan Oduwa joined during the autumn. VB was good in many matches, but after the autumn was the team had only won four matches.

The squad was strengthened during the winter break with Kjartan Finnbogason, Malte Amundsen, Branko Ilic and Mathias Hebo, but even though the Vejle team was good in many matches, the results were not forthcoming. In March – after a defeat to FC Copenhagen – Italian Adolfo Sormani handed over the responsibility to Constantin Gâlcă. The Romanian and his staff improved the results when VB continued in the relegation group against AGF, SønderjyskE and AC Horsens. Despite eight points in six games, VB ended up last in the pool and had to compete in two matches against Hobro IK for access to the next play-off round for survival. After 1–0 in Hobro, VB lost 0–2 at Vejle Stadium. Vejle Boldklub's comeback season was a sportive disappointment, but VB had a strong hold on the audience. There were 5,800 spectators on average for the team's matches and it placed 7th out of 14 teams in the league based on spectators.

In February 2020, Vejle Boldklub presented a record profit of 11.5 million for the financial year 2019. The impressive result came after the relegation to the 1st division. A number of player sales, in particular, helped to create a substantial result. In 2019, VB sold players such as Rasmus Lauritsen, Gustaf Nilsson, Bubacarr "Steve" Trawally and youth player Andreas Jungdal, but CEO Henrik Tønder pointed out that there was also growth in core areas such as sponsorship and matchday income.

Vejle Boldklub quickly put aside the disappointment of the relegation, and began the work of creating a potential top-tier team. Contracts were extended with profiles such as Jacob Schoop, Kjartan Finnbogason, Tobias Mølgaard and Sergiy Gryn after the relegation, while the squad was strengthened with Diego Montiel, Indy Groothuizen and Lucas Jensen. After the first few rounds, the Finn Juhani Ojala was brought in. The results were fluctuating in July and August, but as the autumn progressed, VB was the best and most stable team in the league. In November, Viborg FF and Vejle met for a showdown in Viborg and the last match of the decade was also one of the most memorable. Down 0–2, VB won 4–3 in a true fireworks display and ended the fall at the top of the second-tier NordicBet LIGA. The fine results continued in the spring season, which ended with 13 matches in two months after the resumption of the NordicBet LIGA after the corona break in Danish football.

Honours
Danish Championship
Winners (5): 1958, 1971, 1972, 1978, 1984
 Runners-up: 1965, 1974, 1996–97

Danish Cup
Winners (6): 1957–58, 1958–59, 1971–72, 1974–75, 1976–77, 1980–81
Runners-up: 1967–68

Europe
1973 was the year when Vejle Boldklub made its debut in the European Champion Clubs' Cup. Vejle was put up against one of the biggest clubs in Europe at the time: Anderlecht from Belgium. Vejle gave the Belgians a good match, but the reds could not keep Anderlecht from progressing in the tournament.

The highlight of Vejle Boldklub's European history came in 1978, when the club went all the way to the quarter finals in the UEFA Cup Winners Cup, where VB lost out to Dutch side FC Twente.

In the 1985–86 season, Vejle lost to eventual Champions' Cup winners FC Steaua București, after a first-leg tie: 1–1, 1–4.

The last time Vejle Boldklub played in Europe was in 1998–99, when the reds were drawn with Real Betis in the first round of the UEFA Cup. Betis came to Denmark with a great team including the star player Denílson.  But against all odds VB won the first match against the Spanish stars as Peter Graulund scored the winner in the dying minutes of the game. However, in Sevilla VB could not follow up on the good result and lost 5–0.

Squad and players

Current squad

Youth players in use 2022-23

Out on loan

Notable players

1950s
 Poul Mejer (1950)
 Poul Jensen (1953)
 Knud Herbert Sørensen (I) (1954)
 Tommy Troelsen (1957)
 Henning Enoksen (1957)
 Bent Sørensen (1957)
1960s
 Johnny Hansen (1962)
 Karsten Lund (1962)
 Ole Fritsen (1963)
 Ulrik le Fevre (1965)
 Jørgen Markussen (1966)
 Flemming Serritslev (1966)
1970s
 Iver Schriver (1970)
 Allan Simonsen (1971)
 Knud Herbert Sørensen (II) (1971)
 Gert Eg (1973)
 Ib Jacquet (1975)
 Ulrich Thychosen  (1975)
 Steen Thychosen (1977)
 Alex Nielsen (1978)
1980s
 John Sivebæk (1980)
 Troels Rasmussen (1980)
 Finn Christensen (1981)
 Peter Kjær (1984)
 Henrik Risom (1986)
 Johnny Mølby (1987)
 Brian Steen Nielsen (1988)
 Preben Elkjær (1988)
 Keld Bordinggaard (1989)
 John Larsen (1989)
 Jacob Laursen (1989)

1990s
 Jesper "Krølle" Mikkelsen (1993)
 Alex Nørlund (1993)
 Thomas Gravesen (1995)
 Kaspar Dalgas (1995)
 Peter Graulund (1995)
 Dejvi Glavevski (1995)
 Thomas Sørensen (1996)
 Erik Boye (1997)
 Ulrik Balling (1999)
2000s
 Steffen Kielstrup (2001)
 Baré (2002)
 Adeshina Lawal (2004)
 Brian Nielsen (2005)
 Bora Zivkovic (2007)
 Pablo Piñones-Arce (2008)
 Jimmy Nielsen (2009)
2010s
 Alexander Scholz (2010)
 Peter Ankersen (2010)
 Arbnor Mucolli (2016)
 Dominic Vinicius (2016)
 Allan Sousa (2017)
2020s
 Wahid Faghir (2020)
 Hugo Ekitike (2021)

Recent history
{|class="wikitable"
|-bgcolor="#efefef"
! Season
!
! Pos.
! Pl.
! W
! D
! L
! GS
! GA
! P
!Cup
!Notes
|-
|1996–97
|SL
|align=right bgcolor=silver|2
|align=right|33||align=right|14||align=right|12||align=right|7
|align=right|57||align=right|38||align=right|54
||
|
|-
|1997–98
|SL
|align=right |4
|align=right|33||align=right|16||align=right|4||align=right|13
|align=right|53||align=right|51||align=right|52
||
|
|-
|1998–99
|SL
|align=right |6
|align=right|33||align=right|14||align=right|5||align=right|14
|align=right|54||align=right|48||align=right|47
||
|
|-
|1999–00
|SL
|align=right |11
|align=right|33||align=right|7||align=right|11||align=right|15
|align=right|38||align=right|68||align=right|32
||5th round
|Relegated
|-
|2000–01
|1D
|align=right bgcolor=silver|2
|align=right|30||align=right|17||align=right|8||align=right|5
|align=right|73||align=right|37||align=right|59
||5th round
|Promoted
|-
|2001–02
|SL
|align=right |11
|align=right|33||align=right|6||align=right|10||align=right|17
|align=right|38||align=right|72||align=right|28
||4th round
|Relegated
|-
|2002–03
|1D
|align=right |5
|align=right|30||align=right|15||align=right|4||align=right|11
|align=right|65||align=right|58||align=right|49
||5th round
|
|-
|2003–04
|1D
|align=right |12
|align=right|30||align=right|8||align=right|6||align=right|16
|align=right|44||align=right|59||align=right|30
||3rd round
|
|-
|2004–05
|1D
|align=right |5
|align=right|30||align=right|14||align=right|7||align=right|9
|align=right|59||align=right|51||align=right|49
||3rd round
|
|-
|2005–06
|1D
|align=right bgcolor=gold|1
|align=right|30||align=right|19||align=right|6||align=right|5
|align=right|62||align=right|32||align=right|63
||3rd round
|Promoted
|-
|2006–07
|SL
|align=right |11
|align=right|33||align=right|6||align=right|7||align=right|20
|align=right|35||align=right|64||align=right|25
||3rd round
|Relegated
|-
|2007–08
|1D
|align=right bgcolor=gold|1
|align=right|30||align=right|25||align=right|3||align=right|2
|align=right|80||align=right|24||align=right|78
||Quarter-finals
|Promoted
|-
|2008–09
|SL
|align=right |11
|align=right|33||align=right|4||align=right|13||align=right|16
|align=right|30||align=right|59||align=right|25
||3rd round
|Relegated
|-
|2009–10
|1D
|align=right |10
|align=right|30||align=right|7||align=right|12||align=right|11
|align=right|33||align=right|34||align=right|33
||Semi-finals
|
|-
|2010–11
|1D
|align=right |3
|align=right|30||align=right|14||align=right|10||align=right|6
|align=right|49||align=right|32||align=right|52
||2rd round
|
|-
|2011–12
|1D
|align=right |3
|align=right|26||align=right|12||align=right|8||align=right|6
|align=right|58||align=right|32||align=right|44
||Quarter-finals
|
|-
|2012–13
|1D
|align=right |3
|align=right|33||align=right|16||align=right|10||align=right|7
|align=right|46||align=right|29||align=right|58
||4rd round
|
|-
|2013–14
|1D
|align=right |7
|align=right|33||align=right|12||align=right|11||align=right|10
|align=right|49||align=right|38||align=right|47
||Quarter-finals
|
|-
|2014–15
|1D
|align=right |5
|align=right|33||align=right|11||align=right|12||align=right|10
|align=right|41||align=right|46||align=right|45
||3rd round
|
|-
|2015–16
|1D
|align=right |5
|align=right|33||align=right|16||align=right|5||align=right|12
|align=right|56||align=right|46||align=right|53
||2rd round
|
|-
|2016–17
|1D
|align=right |9
|align=right|33||align=right|10||align=right|11||align=right|12
|align=right|49||align=right|46||align=right|41
||2rd round
|
|-
|2017–18
|1D
|align=right bgcolor=gold|1
|align=right|33||align=right|18||align=right|11||align=right|4
|align=right|47||align=right|24||align=right|65
||2rd round
|Promoted
|-
|2018–19
|SL
|align=right |13
|align=right|32||align=right|6||align=right|10||align=right|16
|align=right|34||align=right|53||align=right|28
||4rd round
|Relegated
|-
|2019–20
|1D
|align=right bgcolor=gold|1
|align=right|33||align=right|20||align=right|8||align=right|5
|align=right|63||align=right|31||align=right|68
||2rd round
|Promoted
|-
|2020–21
|SL
|align=right |10
|align=right|32||align=right|9||align=right|11||align=right|12
|align=right|42||align=right|50||align=right|38
||Quarter-finals
|
|}

Note: SL = Danish Superliga, 1D = Danish 1st Division

Achievements
43 seasons in the Highest Danish League
17 seasons in the Second Highest Danish League
9 seasons in the Third Highest Danish League

Coaches 1990–present
 Ebbe Skovdahl (1990–1991)
 Allan Simonsen (1991–1994)
 Ole Fritsen (1994–1999)
 Poul Erik Andreasen (2000)
 Keld Bordinggaard (2001–2002)
 Frank Petersen (2002–2003)
 Henrik Brandenborg (2003)
 Steen Thychosen (2003)
 Jens Tang Olesen (2004)
 Hans Lauge and Mogens Nielsen (2004)
 Frank Andersen (2004–2005)
 Lasse Christensen and Jesper Søgaard (2005)
 Kim Poulsen (2006–2007)
 Ove Christensen (2007–2009)
 Lasse Christensen and Ole Schwennesen (2009)
 Mats Gren (2009–2011)
 Viggo Jensen (2011)
 Nicolai Wael (2011–2013)
 Kim Brink (2013)
 Tonny Hermansen (2013–2014)
 Klebér Saarenpää (2014–2016)
 Steen Thychosen (2016)
 Andreas Alm (2016–2017)
 Adolfo Sormani (2017–2019)
 Constantin Gâlcă (2019–2021)
 Carit Falch (2021)
 Peter Sørensen  (2021–2022)
 Ivan Prelec  (2022–)

Captains 2003–present
 Klaus Eskildsen (2003)
 Peter Degn (2003)
 Carsten Hemmingsen (2004)
 Steffen Kielstrup (2005)
 Jakob Bresemann (2005–2006)
 Bora Zivkovic (2006)
 Klebér Saarenpää (2007)
 Bora Zivkovic (2007–2008)
 Jimmy Nielsen (2008–09)
 Steffen Kielstrup (2010–2012)
 Jens Berthel Askou (2012–2013)
 Henrik Bødker (2013–2015)
 Niels Bisp Rasmussen (2015–2016)
 Steffen Kielstrup (2016–2017)
 Jacob Schoop (2017–2022)
 Denis Kolinger (2022)
 Raúl Albentosa (2022-present)

References

External links

 Official website

 
Football clubs in Denmark
Association football clubs established in 1891
1891 establishments in Denmark
Companies based in Vejle Municipality
Vejle